The World Group Play-offs were the main play-offs of 2005 Davis Cup. Winners advanced to the World Group, and loser were relegated in the Zonal Regions I.

Teams
Bold indicates team has qualified for the 2006 Davis Cup World Group.

 From World Group

 From Americas Group I

 From Asia/Oceania Group I

 From Europe/Africa Group I

Results

Seeded teams
 
 
 
 
 
 
 
 

Unseeded teams

 
 
 
 
 
  
 
 

  are promoted to the World Group in 2006.
  are relegated to Zonal Group I in 2006.

Playoff results

Austria vs. Ecuador

Canada vs. Belarus

Chile vs. Pakistan

Czech Republic vs. Germany

Italy vs. Spain

India vs. Sweden

Switzerland vs. Great Britain

Belgium vs. United States

References

World Group Play-offs